Byron Antom Scott (born March 28, 1961) is an American former professional basketball player and head coach in the National Basketball Association (NBA). As a player, Scott won three NBA championships with the Los Angeles Lakers during their Showtime era in the 1980s. He was named the NBA Coach of the Year with the New Orleans Hornets (now Pelicans) in 2008.

Early life & college career
Scott grew up in Inglewood, California, and played at Morningside High School, in the shadow of what was then the Lakers' home arena, The Forum. He played college basketball at Arizona State University for three years and had a successful career with the Sun Devils. He was Pac-10 Freshman of the Year in 1980 and First-team All-Pac-10 in 1983. He averaged 17.5 points per game in his career for the Sun Devils. He left after his junior year, entering the 1983 NBA Draft. In 2011, his No. 11 was retired by the Arizona State Sun Devils.

Professional career

NBA
Selected by the San Diego Clippers in the first round, with the fourth pick of the 1983 NBA draft, Scott was traded to the Los Angeles Lakers in 1983 in exchange for Norm Nixon. During his playing career, Scott suited up for the Lakers, Indiana Pacers and Vancouver Grizzlies. Scott was a key player for the Lakers during the Showtime era, being a starter alongside Magic Johnson, James Worthy, Kareem Abdul-Jabbar and A. C. Green. He played for the Lakers for 10 consecutive seasons (1983–1993). During that time he was on three NBA championship teams (1985, 1987, 1988). As a rookie, Scott was a member of the 1984 all-rookie team, averaging 10.6 PPG in 22 MPG. He led the NBA in three-point field goal percentage (.433) in 1984–85. In 1987–88, Scott enjoyed his best season, leading the NBA champion Lakers in scoring, averaging a career-best 21.7 ppg, and in steals (1.91 spg). He was the Lakers' starting shooting guard from 1984 until 1993.

Scott was released by the Lakers after the 1992–93 season and signed a free-agent contract with the Pacers.  In Game 1 of the Pacers' first-round playoff matchup against the Orlando Magic, Scott hit the game-winning three-point shot with 2.4 seconds left.  The Pacers would go on to sweep the Magic and eventually advance to the Eastern Conference Finals for the first time in franchise history.

Scott was left unprotected by the Pacers in the 1995 NBA expansion draft and was selected by the Vancouver Grizzlies, where he played one season.

In 1996–97, the last year of Scott's playing career in the NBA, he went back to the Lakers and proved to be a valuable mentor for a team featuring Shaquille O'Neal, Eddie Jones, Nick Van Exel and 18-year-old rookie Kobe Bryant (Scott would be Bryant's coach on the Lakers towards the end of the latter's career).

Panathinaikos

In the summer of 1997, Scott signed with the Greek Basket League team Panathinaikos for the 1997–98 season. That season, he played with Panathinaikos in both the FIBA Saporta Cup (known then as the FIBA EuroCup), Europe's second-tier level competition after the top-tier EuroLeague, and the Greek Basket League. In the Saporta Cup's 1997–98 season, he averaged 13.4 points, 2.4 rebounds, 2.1 assists, and 1.1 steals, in 25.6 minutes per game, in 17 games played.

Scott helped to lead his team to the Greek Basket League championship with his scoring in many crucial games. In the Greek Basket League's 1997–98 season, he averaged 17.6 points, 2.8 rebounds, 2.3 assists, and 1.3 steals per game, in 33.7 minutes per game, in 34 games played. After one season with the Greek Basket League champions, Scott retired from playing professional basketball, and began his coaching career.

Coaching career

Sacramento Kings
Scott began his NBA coaching career in 1998, when he began the first of two seasons as an assistant with the Sacramento Kings. He specialized in teaching perimeter shooting during his tenure with the Kings and helped to lead the team to an excellent three-point shooting percentage during a pair of playoff seasons.

New Jersey Nets
In 2000, Scott took over a struggling New Jersey Nets team. His team performed poorly in his first year, but that changed in the 2001–02 season with the arrival of Jason Kidd as the Nets raced to a franchise record of 52 wins. In the process, they won their first Atlantic Division crown and appeared in their first NBA Finals against the Los Angeles Lakers. Despite losing the championship series to LA, Scott came back to coach the team through another successful season during the 2002–03 campaign, once again taking the team to the NBA Finals, but losing once again—this time to the San Antonio Spurs. New Jersey was up by double figures in game six, but the Spurs tightened up their defense, which won the game and the championship.

Scott was fired during the 2003–04 season, as New Jersey had a disappointing 22–20 record coming into the All-Star break, even though they were leading their division at the time of his dismissal. Rumors of a rift between Scott and Kidd circulated media outlets, with sources allegedly claiming that Kidd wanted Scott out of Jersey. All the parties, including then Nets GM Rod Thorn, denied the reports. Scott claimed that he was "very surprised" by the report and that he and Kidd "always got along".

He was succeeded by his assistant Lawrence Frank. While coaching the Nets, Scott lived in Livingston, New Jersey.

New Orleans Hornets

Scott became the head coach of the New Orleans Hornets in 2004. Chris Paul was drafted by the team in 2005, and was named Rookie of the Year. In the 2005–06 and 2006–07 seasons, he guided the team to a pair of sub .500 seasons. One obstacle was that the team played most of its home games in Oklahoma City due to Hurricane Katrina's devastation of New Orleans.

In the 2007–08 season, Scott had his first winning season as the Hornets head coach. They had a winning percentage of .683 with a record of 56–26. They became Southwest Division champions and finished 2nd overall in the Western Conference. Scott was named the head coach of the 2008 Western Conference All-Star team, and a few months after, he was awarded the 2007–08 NBA Coach of the Year Award. Due to his success, the Hornets awarded Scott with a two-year extension.

The Hornets had a 30–11 home record and a 26–15 road record and clinched the second seed in the Western Conference Playoffs. The Hornets won their first-round series against the Dallas Mavericks, posting a 4–1 record for the series. They would go on to face the defending champion San Antonio Spurs in the conference semifinals. An unusual trend of home court blowouts would mark the series until the deciding game 7 when the veteran Spurs would pull out a 91–82 win on the Hornets rowdy home court. The win marked the 100th playoff victory for Spurs coach Gregg Popovich.

In the 2008–09 season, the Hornets finished 49–33 and entered the playoffs as a seventh seed. They faced the Denver Nuggets in the first round, losing after five brutal games, including a 58-point loss in game 4, which tied the worst margin of defeat in NBA postseason history. Scott was relieved from his head coaching duties for the Hornets on November 12, 2009, following a 3–6 start. He was mentioned as a candidate for several NBA coaching jobs, including the Chicago Bulls.

Following his dismissal, he briefly served as a studio analyst for the NBA on ESPN.

Cleveland Cavaliers

On July 1, 2010, Scott was named head coach of the Cleveland Cavaliers, a few days before the team lost star LeBron James to the Miami Heat. During Scott's first season at the helm of the Cavaliers, he watched his team endure a 26-game losing streak, which was then the longest such streak in NBA history. Scott was reunited with Baron Davis (whom he coached with the Hornets) when a mid-season trade brought Davis to Cleveland, and helped the Cavaliers close the season with several victories, including a 102–90 upset victory over LeBron James and the Miami Heat, which ensured that Cleveland did not have the worst record in the league at the season's end.

Cleveland used their first overall pick to draft Kyrie Irving, who became the second point guard Scott coached to the Rookie of the Year award. His second season in Cleveland saw them show some improvement in a shortened 66-game schedule.

On April 18, 2013, Scott was fired by Cleveland Cavaliers management. Though the Cavaliers ranked in the bottom five of the league in defensive efficiency in each of his three seasons, analysts were surprised at the firing given the team's young and oft-injured rosters. Irving and other Cavaliers players expressed their disappointment with the firing.

Los Angeles Lakers
Scott spent the 2013–14 season as a Lakers television analyst on Time Warner Cable SportsNet. After the season, he was the frontrunner to become the new Lakers head coach. Scott interviewed three times for the position, which had become vacant after Mike D'Antoni's resignation. On July 28, 2014, he signed a multi-year contract to coach the Lakers.

With the team rebuilding in 2014–15, Scott finished his first season as coach of the Lakers with a 21–61 record. In the 2015 NBA draft, the Lakers selected Ohio State point guard D'Angelo Russell with the second overall pick. The Lakers finished a franchise-worst 17–65 in 2015–16, Kobe Bryant's final season before retiring. On April 24, 2016, the Lakers did not exercise their option on Scott's contract for the following season, deciding to pursue a new coach. His 38–126 (.232) record with the team was the worst of any of the 16 coaches who had led the franchise for at least two seasons.

NBA career statistics

NBA

Regular season

|-
| style="text-align:left;"|
| style="text-align:left;"|L.A. Lakers
| 74 || 49 || 22.1 || .484 || .235 || .806 || 2.2 || 2.4 || 1.1 || .3 || 10.6
|-
| style="text-align:left; background:#afe6ba;"|†
| style="text-align:left;"|L.A. Lakers
| 81 || 65 || 28.5 || .539 || .433 || .820 || 2.6 || 3.0 || 1.1 || .2 || 16.0
|-
| style="text-align:left;"|
| style="text-align:left;"|L.A. Lakers
| 76 || 62 || 28.8 || .513 || .361 || .784 || 2.5 || 2.2 || 1.1 || .2 || 15.4
|-
| style="text-align:left; background:#afe6ba;"|†
| style="text-align:left;"|L.A. Lakers
| 82 || 82 || 33.3 || .489 || .436 || .892 || 3.5 || 3.4 || 1.5 || .2 || 17.0
|-
| style="text-align:left; background:#afe6ba;"|†
| style="text-align:left;"|L.A. Lakers
| 81 || 81 || 37.6 || .527 || .346 || .858 || 4.1 || 4.1 || 1.9 || .3 || 21.7
|-
| style="text-align:left;"|
| style="text-align:left;"|L.A. Lakers
| 74 || 73 || 35.2 || .491 || .399 || .863 || 4.1 || 3.1 || 1.5 || .4 || 19.6
|-
| style="text-align:left;"|
| style="text-align:left;"|L.A. Lakers
| 77 || 77 || 33.7 || .470 || .423 || .766 || 3.1 || 3.6 || 1.0 || .4 || 15.5
|-
| style="text-align:left;"|
| style="text-align:left;"|L.A. Lakers
| 82 || 82 || 32.1 || .477 || .324 || .797 || 3.0 || 2.2 || 1.2 || .3 || 14.5
|-
| style="text-align:left;"|
| style="text-align:left;"|L.A. Lakers
| 82 || 82 || 32.7 || .458 || .344 || .838 || 3.8 || 2.8 || 1.3 || .3 || 14.9
|-
| style="text-align:left;"|
| style="text-align:left;"|L.A. Lakers
| 58 || 53 || 28.9 || .449 || .326 || .848 || 2.3 || 2.7 || .9 || .2 || 13.7
|-
| style="text-align:left;"|
| style="text-align:left;"|Indiana
| 67 || 2 || 17.9 || .467 || .365 || .805 || 1.6 || 2.0 || .9 || .1 || 10.4
|-
| style="text-align:left;"|
| style="text-align:left;"|Indiana
| 80 || 1 || 19.1 || .455 || .389 || .850 || 1.9 || 1.4 || .8 || .2 || 10.0
|-
| style="text-align:left;"|
| style="text-align:left;"|Vancouver
| 80 || 0 || 23.7 || .401 || .335 || .835 || 2.4 || 1.5 || .8 || .3 || 10.2
|-
| style="text-align:left;"|
| style="text-align:left;"|L.A. Lakers
| 79 || 8 || 18.2 || .430 || .388 || .841 || 1.5 || 1.3 || .6 || .2 || 6.7
|- class="sortbottom"
| style="text-align:center;" colspan="2"|Career
| 1073 || 717 || 28.1 || .482 || .370 || .833 || 2.8 || 2.5 || 1.1 || .3 || 14.1

Playoffs

|-
| style="text-align:left;"|1984
| style="text-align:left;"|L.A. Lakers
| 20 || 0 || 20.2 || .460 || .200 || .600 || 1.9 || 1.7 || .9 || .1 || 8.6
|-
| style="text-align:left; background:#afe6ba;"|1985†
| style="text-align:left;"|L.A. Lakers
| 19 || 19 || 30.8 || .517 || .476 || .795 || 2.7 || 2.6 || 2.2 || .2 || 16.9
|-
| style="text-align:left;"|1986
| style="text-align:left;"|L.A. Lakers
| 14 || 14 || 33.6 || .497 || .353 || .905 || 3.9 || 3.0 || 1.4 || .1 || 16.0
|-
| style="text-align:left; background:#afe6ba;"|1987†
| style="text-align:left;"|L.A. Lakers
| 18 || 18 || 33.8 || .490 || .206 || .791 || 3.4 || 3.2 || 1.1 || .2 || 14.8
|-
| style="text-align:left; background:#afe6ba;"|1988†
| style="text-align:left;"|L.A. Lakers
| 24 || 24 || 37.4 || .499 || .436 || .865 || 4.2 || 2.5 || 1.4 || .2 || 19.6
|-
| style="text-align:left;"|1989
| style="text-align:left;"|L.A. Lakers
| 11 || 11 || 36.5 || .494 || .385 || .836 || 4.1 || 2.3 || 1.6 || .2 || 19.9
|-
| style="text-align:left;"|1990
| style="text-align:left;"|L.A. Lakers
| 9 || 9 || 36.1 || .462 || .382 || .769 || 4.1 || 2.6 || 2.2 || .3 || 13.4
|-
| style="text-align:left;"|1991
| style="text-align:left;"|L.A. Lakers
| 18 || 18 || 37.7 || .511 || .526 || .794 || 3.2 || 1.6 || 1.3 || .2 || 13.2
|-
| style="text-align:left;"|1992
| style="text-align:left;"|L.A. Lakers
| 4 || 4 || 37.0 || .500 || .583 || .889 || 2.5 || 3.5 || 1.5 || .3 || 18.8
|-
| style="text-align:left;"|1993
| style="text-align:left;"|L.A. Lakers
| 5 || 5 || 35.4 || .500 || .533 || .783 || 2.2 || 1.8 || 1.0 || .0 || 13.6
|-
| style="text-align:left;"|1994
| style="text-align:left;"|Indiana
| 16 || 0 || 14.9 || .396 || .474 || .784 || 2.1 || 1.3 || .8 || .1 || 7.8
|-
| style="text-align:left;"|1995
| style="text-align:left;"|Indiana
| 17 || 0 || 17.5 || .340 || .265 || .882 || 1.5 || .9 || .6 || .1 || 6.1
|-
| style="text-align:left;"|1997
| style="text-align:left;"|L.A. Lakers
| 8 || 0 || 16.8 || .455 || .364 || .895 || 1.5 || 1.4 || .1 || .0 || 6.4
|- class="sortbottom"
| style="text-align:center;" colspan="2"|Career
| 183 || 122 || 29.3 || .482 || .395 || .819 || 2.9 || 2.1 || 1.2 || .2 || 13.4

Head coaching record

|-
| style="text-align:left;"|New Jersey
| style="text-align:left;"|
| 82||26||56|||| style="text-align:center;"|6th in Atlantic||—||—||—||—
| style="text-align:center;"|Missed playoffs
|- 
| style="text-align:left;"|New Jersey
| style="text-align:left;"|
| 82||52||30|||| style="text-align:center;"|1st in Atlantic||20||11||9||
| style="text-align:center;"|Lost in NBA Finals
|- 
| style="text-align:left;"|New Jersey
| style="text-align:left;"|
| 82||49||33|||| style="text-align:center;"|1st in Atlantic||20||14||6||
| style="text-align:center;"|Lost in NBA Finals
|- 
| style="text-align:left;"|New Jersey
| style="text-align:left;"|
| 42||22||20|||| style="text-align:center;"|(fired)||—||—||—||—
| style="text-align:center;"|—
|- 
| style="text-align:left;"|New Orleans
| style="text-align:left;"|
| 82||18||64|||| style="text-align:center;"|5th in Southwest||—||—||—||—
| style="text-align:center;"|Missed playoffs
|- 
| style="text-align:left;"|New Orleans/Oklahoma City
| style="text-align:left;"|
| 82||38||44|||| style="text-align:center;"|4th in Southwest||—||—||—||—
| style="text-align:center;"|Missed playoffs
|- 
| style="text-align:left;"|New Orleans/Oklahoma City
| style="text-align:left;"|
| 82||39||43|||| style="text-align:center;"|4th in Southwest||—||—||—||—
| style="text-align:center;"|Missed playoffs
|- 
| style="text-align:left;"|New Orleans
| style="text-align:left;"|
| 82||56||26|||| style="text-align:center;"|1st in Southwest||12||7||5||
| style="text-align:center;"|Lost in Conference Semifinals
|- 
| style="text-align:left;"|New Orleans
| style="text-align:left;"|
| 82||49||33|||| style="text-align:center;"|4th in Southwest||5||1||4||
| style="text-align:center;"|Lost in First Round
|-
| style="text-align:left;"|New Orleans
| style="text-align:left;"|
| 9||3||6|||| style="text-align:center;"|(fired)||—||—||—||—
| style="text-align:left;"|—
|-
| style="text-align:left;"|Cleveland
| style="text-align:left;"|
| 82||19||63|||| style="text-align:center;"|5th in Central||—||—||—||—
| style="text-align:center;"|Missed playoffs
|-
| style="text-align:left;"|Cleveland
| style="text-align:left;"|
| 66||21||45|||| style="text-align:center;"|5th in Central||—||—||—||—
| style="text-align:center;"|Missed playoffs
|-
| style="text-align:left;"|Cleveland
| style="text-align:left;"|
| 82||24||58|||| style="text-align:center;"|5th in Central||—||—||—||—
| style="text-align:center;"|Missed playoffs
|-
| style="text-align:left;"|L.A. Lakers
| style="text-align:left;"|
| 82||21||61|||| style="text-align:center;"|5th in Pacific||—||—||—||—
| style="text-align:center;"|Missed playoffs
|-
| style="text-align:left;"|L.A. Lakers
| style="text-align:left;"|
| 82||17||65|||| style="text-align:center;"|5th in Pacific||—||—||—||—
| style="text-align:center;"|Missed playoffs
|- class="sortbottom"
| style="text-align:center;" colspan="2"|Career
| 1,101||454||647|||| ||57||33||24||
| style="text-align:center;"|

Personal life
Scott's non-profit organization, The Byron Scott Children's Fund, has raised more than $15 million over the past decade, with the proceeds going to various children's charities. Scott has recently served as a studio analyst for ABC's NBA telecasts and was featured on ESPN.

Scott and his ex-wife, Anita, have 3 children. In June 2013, Scott and Anita separated and in March 2014, he filed for divorce after 29 years of marriage due to irreconcilable differences.

On July 11, 2020, Scott married Cece Gutierrez, a registered nurse and cast member of VH1's reality show Basketball Wives. He converted to Catholicism in late 2020 following their marriage.

Scott went back to school at Arizona State 37 years after leaving school early when he was drafted by the Lakers, and obtained a bachelor's degree in liberal arts, fulfilling a promise he'd made to his late mother.

See also

 List of National Basketball Association career playoff steals leaders

Notes

References

External links

  at NBA.com
  at NBA.com
 Scott's statistics as a coach
 Scott's FIBA Saporta Cup profile
 Scott's Greek Basket League profile

1961 births
Living people
20th-century African-American sportspeople
21st-century African-American people
African-American basketball coaches
African-American basketball players
African-American Catholics
American expatriate basketball people in Canada
American expatriate basketball people in Greece
American men's basketball coaches
American men's basketball players
Arizona State Sun Devils men's basketball players
Basketball coaches from California
Basketball coaches from Utah
Basketball players from Inglewood, California
Basketball players from Utah
Cleveland Cavaliers head coaches
Greek Basket League players
Indiana Pacers players
Los Angeles Lakers announcers
Los Angeles Lakers head coaches
Los Angeles Lakers players
McDonald's High School All-Americans
National Basketball Association broadcasters
New Jersey Nets head coaches
New Orleans Hornets head coaches
Panathinaikos B.C. players
Parade High School All-Americans (boys' basketball)
People from Livingston, New Jersey
Sportspeople from Ogden, Utah
Sacramento Kings assistant coaches
San Diego Clippers draft picks
Shooting guards
Vancouver Grizzlies expansion draft picks
Vancouver Grizzlies players